Eldar Memišević (born 21 June 1992) is a Bosnian-born Qatari handball player  for Al Rayyan and the Qatari national team.

References

1992 births
Living people
People from Maglaj
Bosnia and Herzegovina male handball players
Qatari people of Bosnia and Herzegovina descent
Naturalised citizens of Qatar
Asian Games medalists in handball
Handball players at the 2014 Asian Games
Handball players at the 2016 Summer Olympics
Olympic handball players of Qatar
Qatari male handball players
Asian Games gold medalists for Qatar
Medalists at the 2014 Asian Games